Anthony LaRue Hutchison (born February 4, 1961) is a former American football running back in the National Football League (NFL) who played for the Chicago Bears and Buffalo Bills. He played college football for the Texas Tech Red Raiders. He was selected as the fifth pick in the tenth round of the 1983 NFL Draft by the Bears, the 256th pick overall.

His professional football career ended in 1985, and Hutchinson started a landscaping company in Texas. In December 1989, in one of the nation's first federal prosecutions regarding knowingly hiring illegal aliens, Hutchinson and one of his employees were convicted of multiple charges related to employing illegal aliens. In March 1990, Hutchinson was sentenced to 60 days in jail, eight months of home detention, and a $2,000 fine.

References

1961 births
Living people
American football running backs
Chicago Bears players
Buffalo Bills players
Texas Tech Red Raiders football players